The Baralong incidents were two incidents during the First World War in August and September 1915, involving the Royal Navy Q-ship  and two German U-boats. Baralong sank , which had been preparing to attack a nearby merchant ship, the Nicosian. About a dozen of the crewmen managed to escape from the sinking submarine and Lieutenant Godfrey Herbert, commanding officer of Baralong, ordered the survivors to be executed after they boarded the Nicosian. All the survivors of U-27s sinking, including several who had reached the Nicosian, were shot by Baralongs crew. Later, Baralong sank  in an incident which has also been described as a British war crime.

First incident

Action of 19 August 1915
He was told, "This Lusitania business is shocking. Unofficially, we are telling you... take no prisoners from U-boats."

Interviews with his subordinate officers have established Herbert's undisciplined manner of commanding his ship. Herbert allowed his men to engage in drunken binges during shore leave. During one such incident, at Dartmouth, several members of Baralongs crew were arrested after destroying a local pub. Herbert paid their bail, then left port with the bailed crewmen aboard. Beginning in April 1915, Herbert ordered his subordinates to cease calling him "Sir", and to address him only by the pseudonym "Captain William McBride".

Throughout the summer of 1915, Baralong continued routine patrol duties in the Irish Sea without encountering the enemy.

On 19 August 1915,  sank the White Star Liner  with the loss of 44 lives – this included three Americans and resulted in a diplomatic incident between Germany and the United States. Baralongs crew was infuriated by the attack and by their inability to locate survivors.

A boarding party of six men from U-27 discovered that Nicosian was carrying munitions and 250 American mules earmarked for the British Army in France. The Germans allowed the freighter's crew and passengers to board lifeboats, and prepared to sink the freighter with the U-boat's deck gun.

U-27 was lying off Nicosians port quarter and firing into it when Baralong appeared on the scene, flying the ensign of the United States as a false flag. When she was half a mile away, Baralong ran up a signal flag indicating that she was going to rescue Nicosians crew. Wegener acknowledged the signal, then ordered his men to cease firing, and took U-27 along the port side of Nicosian to intercept Baralong. As the submarine disappeared behind the steamship, Herbert steered Baralong on a parallel course along Nicosians starboard side.

Before U-27 came round Nicosians bow, Baralong hauled down the American flag, hoisted the Royal Navy's White Ensign, and unmasked her guns. U-27 rolled over and began to sink.

According to Tony Bridgland;
Herbert screamed, "Cease fire!" But his men's blood was up. They were avenging the Arabic and the Lusitania. For them this was no time to cease firing, even as the survivors of the crew appeared on the outer casing, struggling out of their clothes to swim away from her. There was a mighty hiss of compressed air from her tanks and the U-27 vanished from sight in a vortex of giant rumbling bubbles, leaving a pall of smoke over the spot where she had been. It had taken only a few minutes to fire the thirty-four shells into her.

Meanwhile, Nicosians crew were cheering from the lifeboats. Captain Manning was heard to yell, "If any of those bastard Huns come up, lads, hit 'em with an oar!"

Twelve men survived the sinking of the submarine: the crews of her two deck guns and those who had been on the conning tower. They swam to Nicosian and attempted to join the six-man boarding party by climbing up its hanging lifeboat falls and pilot ladder. Despite his recent orders to take no prisoners from U-boats, Herbert claimed in his report to the Admiralty to have been worried that the German survivors might try to scuttle the steamer as an explanation for why he ordered his men to open fire with small arms, killing all in the water. Wegener is described by some accounts as being shot while trying to swim to the Baralong.

Herbert then sent Baralongs 12 Royal Marines, commanded by a Corporal Collins, to find the surviving German sailors aboard Nicosian. As they departed, Herbert ordered Collins, "Take no prisoners." The Germans were discovered in the engine room and shot on sight. According to Sub-Lieutenant Gordon Charles Steele: "Wegener ran to a cabin on the upper deck – I later found out it was Manning's bathroom. The marines broke down the door with the butts of their rifles, but Wegener squeezed through a scuttle and dropped into the sea. He still had his life-jacket on and put up his arms in surrender. Corporal Collins, however, took aim and shot him through the head." Corporal Collins later recalled that, after Wegener's death, Herbert threw a revolver in the dead German captain's face and screamed, "What about the Lusitania, you bastard!" An alternative allegation by the Admiralty is that the Germans who boarded Nicosian were killed by the freighter's engine room staff; this report apparently came from the officer commanding the muleteers.

Aftermath
In Herbert's report to the Admiralty, he stated he feared the survivors from the U-boat's crew would board the freighter and scuttle it, so he ordered the Royal Marines on his ship to shoot the survivors. If they had scuttled the freighter, it could have been considered as negligence on the part of Herbert. Moments before Baralong began its attack, the submarine was firing on the freighter. It is not known if the escaping sailors actually intended to scuttle the freighter.

The Admiralty, upon receiving Herbert's report, immediately ordered its suppression, but the strict censorship imposed on the event failed when Americans who had witnessed the incident from Nicosians lifeboats spoke to newspaper reporters after their return to the United States.

German memorandum
The German government delivered a memorandum on the incident via the American ambassador in Berlin, who received it on 6 December 1915. In it, they cited six US citizens as witnesses, stating they had made sworn depositions regarding the incident before notaries public in the USA.

The statements said that five survivors from U-27 managed to board Nicosian, while the rest were shot and killed on Herbert's orders while clinging to the merchant vessel's lifeboat falls. It was further stated that when Herbert ordered his Marines to board Nicosian, he gave the order "take no prisoners". Four German sailors were found in Nicosians engine room and propeller shaft tunnel, and were killed. According to the witness statements, U-27s commander was shot while swimming towards Baralong.

The memorandum demanded that the captain and crew of Baralong be tried for the murder of unarmed German sailors, threatening to "take the serious decision of retribution for an unpunished crime". Sir Edward Grey replied through the American ambassador that the incident could be grouped together with the Germans' sinking of SS Arabic, their attack on a stranded British submarine on the neutral Danish coast, and their attack on the steamship Ruel, and suggested that they be placed before a tribunal composed of US Navy officers.

German reaction
A debate took place in the Reichstag on 15 January 1916, where the incident was described as a "cowardly murder" and Grey's note as being "full of insolence and arrogance". It was announced that reprisals had been decided, but not what they would be.

Meanwhile, the Military Bureau for the Investigation of Violations of the Laws of War added Baralongs commanding officer, whose name was known only as "Captain William McBride", to the Prussian Ministry of War's "Black List of Englishmen who are Guilty of Violations of the Laws of War vis-à-vis Members of the German Armed Forces".

HMS Baralongs actions caused the Kaiserliche Marine to cease conforming to the Prize Rules and to practise unrestricted submarine warfare. During the Second World War, it was cited as a reason for the Kriegsmarine to do the same. A German medal was issued commemorating the event.

As a precaution to protect the ships against any reprisals against their crews, HMS Baralong was renamed HMS Wyandra and transferred to the Mediterranean. Baralongs name was deleted from Lloyd's Register. In 1916 Wyandra returned to the Ellerman & Bucknall Line under the name Manica.  Nicosian was renamed Nevisian, and the crew was issued new Discharge Books, with the voyage omitted.

Baralongs crew were later awarded £185 prize bounty for sinking U-27.

Second incident

Action of 24 September 1915
On 24 September 1915, Baralong sank the U-boat , for which its commanding officer at the time, Lieutenant-Commander A. Wilmot-Smith, was later awarded £170 prize bounty.

U-41 was in the process of sinking SS Urbino with gunfire when Baralong arrived on the scene, flying an American flag. When U-41 surfaced near Baralong, the latter opened fire while continuing to fly the American flag, and sank the U-boat.

Aftermath of the second incident
Unlike the neutral Americans in the first incident, the only witnesses to the second attack were the German and British sailors present. Oberleutnant zur See Iwan Crompton, after returning to Germany from a prisoner-of-war camp, reported that Baralong had run down the lifeboat he was in; he leapt clear and was soon afterward taken aboard Baralong. The British crew denied that they had run down the lifeboat. Crompton later published an account of U-41s exploits in 1917, U-41: der zweite Baralong-Fall, which termed the sinking of U-41 a "second Baralong case".

The event was also commemorated by a propaganda medal designed by the German engraver Karl Goetz. This was one of many medals that were popular in Germany from about 1910 to 1940.

See also
 Unrestricted submarine warfare
 Merchant raiders
 Commerce raiding
 Tonnage war

References

Works cited

General references
 

World War I massacres
Conflicts in 1915
Atlantic operations of World War I
Extrajudicial killings
Deaths by firearm in international waters
Massacres in 1915
World War I crimes by the British Empire and Commonwealth